James Turner may refer to:

Entertainment
 James Alfred Turner (1850–1908), Australian painter
 James Turner (illustrator) (active 2005–2008), Canadian writer and illustrator of graphic novels
 James Turner (active 1930–1947) in List of Swallows and Amazons characters
 James Turner (active since 2004), writer of the webcomic Beaver and Steve
 James Turner (Active since 2010), British Character designer, Pokémon Art director for Pokémon franchise and creator of HarmoKnight and Tembo the Badass Elephant.

Politics
 James Turner (North Carolina politician) (1766–1824), U.S. governor and senator
 James Turner (Maryland politician) (1783–1861), U.S. congressman
 James Aspinall Turner (1797–1867), British businessman, entomologist and Whig politician
 James Turner (Canadian politician) (1826–1889), Scottish merchant and political figure in Ontario
 James Milton Turner (1840–1915), ambassador to Liberia and asst. superintendent of Missouri schools
 James Turner, 1st Baron Netherthorpe (1908–1980), British peer
 James M. Turner (1928–1981), American politician and criminal from New Jersey
 James Munroe Turner (1850–1896), American politician in Michigan

Sports
 James Turner (Nottinghamshire cricketer) (1865–1945), English cricketer
 James Turner (Worcestershire cricketer) (1886–1968), English cricketer
 Lefty Turner (James Henry Turner, 1912–2000), American Negro leagues baseball player
 James Turner (tennis) (born 1965), British tennis player
 James Turner (parathlete) (born 1996), Australian Paralympic athlete
 James Turner (rugby union) (born 1998), Australian rugby union player
 James Turner (footballer) (1898–1973), English footballer

Other
 James Turner (soldier) (1615 – c. 1686), 17th-century Scottish general
 James Turner (bishop) (1829–1893), Australian Anglican bishop
 James Smith Turner (1832–1904), Scottish dentist
 James Turner (architect) (died 1899), Architect based in Matlock, Derbyshire
 James Luther Turner (1891–1964), founder of J.L. Turner and Son
 James Turner (historian) (born 1946), American historian and professor
 James T. Turner (born 1938), judge of the United States Claims Court
 James Turner (silversmith) (1721–1759), American silversmith and engraver

See also
 James Turner Street in Birmingham, England
 Jamie Turner (born 1962), Australian rules footballer for Collingwood
 Jim Turner (disambiguation)
 Jimmy Turner (disambiguation)
 Jock Turner (Australian footballer) (1909–1935), Australian rules footballer for Essendon